Record Collection may refer to:

Record Collection (record label), a Los Angeles-based music studio
Record Collection (album), a 2010 album by Mark Ronson & The Business Intl.
"Record Collection", a song by Kaiser Chiefs on the 2019 album, Duck

See also
Record collecting
Record Collector, a British monthly music magazine